Hedges Worthington-Eyre (8 September 1899 – 20 October 1979) was a British sprinter. He competed in the men's 400 metres at the 1920 Summer Olympics.

References

External links

1899 births
1979 deaths
Athletes (track and field) at the 1920 Summer Olympics
British male sprinters
Olympic athletes of Great Britain